Wila Nasa (Aymara ''wila red, nasa nose, "red nose") is a mountain in the Andes of Bolivia which reaches a height of approximately . It is situated in the Potosí Department, Antonio Quijarro Province, Tomave Municipality. Wila Nasa lies southwest of Kuntur Chukuña.

References 

Mountains of Potosí Department